Ion, in comics, may refer to:

 Ion (DC Comics), an entity in the DC Comics universe. Ion is a benevolent symbiote that embodies willpower, the driving force behind the Green Lantern Corps and their power rings. When the entity has a host, the name Ion is often used as an alias by the hosting character, who include:
 Kyle Rayner, a human member of the Green Lantern Corps and Ion's host while Hal Jordan is the host of Parallax, the DC Universe's malevolent and symbiotic fear entity, and during his exile
 Sodam Yat, a Daxamite member of the Green Lantern Corps and Kyle Rayner's successor as Ion's host
 Ion (Marvel Comics), a super villain in the Marvel Comics universe
 I.O.N, a manga by Arina Tanemura

See also
Ion (disambiguation)